Hurbanova Ves ( or ) is a village and municipality in western Slovakia in Senec District in the Bratislava Region.

History
In historical records the village was first mentioned in 1960.

Geography
The municipality lies at an altitude of 125 metres and covers an area of 5.413 km². It has a population of 264 people.

Demography
Population by nationality:

References

External links/Sources

  Official page
https://web.archive.org/web/20070513023228/http://www.statistics.sk/mosmis/eng/run.html

Villages and municipalities in Senec District